Alcobendas Club de Fútbol is a Spanish football club based in Alcobendas, in the Community of Madrid. Founded in 1970, it plays in Preferente de Aficionados – Group 1, holding home games at Valdelasfuentes, which has a capacity of 1,000 spectators.

History
Founded in 1970 as Agrupación Deportiva Alcobendas, the club enjoyed 10 seasons in the fourth division in 15 years, but spent the vast majority of its existence in the Madrid regional leagues. In 2010, it was renamed Alcobendas Club de Fútbol.

In 1995, another club in the city was founded, Fútbol Alcobendas Sport. It also competed in the same divisions.

Season to season

13 seasons in Tercera División

External links
Official website 
Futmadrid team profile 

Football clubs in the Community of Madrid
Divisiones Regionales de Fútbol clubs
Association football clubs established in 1970
1970 establishments in Spain
Sport in Alcobendas